Guilford is a town in New Haven County, Connecticut, United States, that borders Madison, Branford, North Branford and Durham, and is situated on I-95 and the Connecticut seacoast. The population was 22,073 at the 2020 census.

History

Guilford was named after the town of Guildford, in England, the native home of a share of its first settlers. In early maps of the Connecticut Colony, the town is seen on several maps as Gilford.

First settled by Europeans in 1639 after a treaty with the “Sachem Squaw” Shaumpishuh. Guilford is considered by some to have the third largest collection of historic homes in New England, with important buildings from the 17th, 18th, and 19th centuries. There are five historic house museums, including Dudley Farm and the Henry Whitfield House (1639), the oldest dwelling house in Connecticut and the oldest stone house built by English settlers in North America. The Comfort Starr House (1695) is one of the oldest wooden framed private dwellings in Connecticut, and one of the few houses remaining of the original signers who settled Guilford.

In June 1781, during the American Revolution, a skirmish was fought on Leete's Island between the Associated Loyalists and local militia under Captain Peter Vail.

Geography

The primary settlement in Guilford, known as Guilford Center, is located in the southern part of town around the intersection of U.S. Route 1 and Connecticut Route 77. It is served by three exits of Interstate 95, which passes just north of the town center. The Guilford Center census-designated place had a population of 2,597 at the 2010 census.

The northwest side of Guilford is flanked by the Metacomet Ridge, a mountainous trap rock ridgeline that stretches from Long Island Sound to nearly the Vermont border. Important features of the Metacomet ridge in Guilford include Totoket Mountain; its most notable peak, Bluff Head; and two eastern high points on the Totoket Mountain ridge named East Sugarloaf and West Sugarloaf. The  Mattabesett Trail traverses Bluff Head; a shorter network of trails criss-cross the Sugarloaves.

Transportation
The Shore Line East train stops at Guilford station with service to Branford, East Haven, New Haven and New London, and the Connecticut Transit S bus travels between Guilford and New Haven several times each day.

Principal communities
 Guilford Center (Guilford's Green)
 Leetes Island
 North Guilford
 Nut Plains
 Shell beach
 Sachems Head (named after a Pequot chief who was killed there and his severed head placed in the crotch of a tree on the knoll.)

Other minor communities and geographic features in Guilford are Guilford Lakes, Indian Cove, and Old Quarry.

Demographics

As of the census of 2000, there were 21,398 people, 8,151 households, and 6,039 families residing in the town. The racial makeup of the town was 96.04% White, 0.93% African American, 0.05% Native American, 1.65% Asian, 0.41% from other races, and 0.93% from two or more races. Hispanic or Latino of any race were 2.13% of the population.

There were 8,151 households, out of which 35.6% had children under the age of 18 living with them, 64.4% were married couples living together, 7.2% had a female householder with no husband present, and 25.9% were non-families. Of all households 21.6% were made up of individuals, and 8.6% had someone living alone who was 65 years of age or older. The average household size was 2.59 and the average family size was 3.04.

In the town, the population was spread out, with 25.4% under the age of 18, 4.4% from 18 to 24, 26.2% from 25 to 44, 31.2% from 45 to 64, and 12.8% who were 65 years of age or older. The median age was 42 years. For every 100 females, there were 92.8 males. For every 100 females age 18 and over, there were 89.5 males.

The median income for a household in the town was $76,843, and the median income for a family was $87,045 (these figures had risen to $90,026 and $104,852 respectively as of a 2007 estimate). Males had a median income of $60,623 versus $40,307 for females. The per capita income for the town was $37,161. About 2.3% of families and 3.1% of the population were below the poverty line, including 3.4% of those under age 18 and 3.8% of those age 65 or over.

In the 2008 presidential election, Democrat Barack Obama received 61.02% of the town vote, against 38.06% for Republican John McCain. In 2016, Democrat Hillary Clinton carried the town with 59.2% over Republican Donald Trump with 37.1%.

Economy
American Cruise Lines has its headquarters in Guilford. There are many small businesses throughout the town, including the shops on the Guilford Green.

List of town parks
The town government operates these parks:

Ice skating available in winter.
 Chaffinch Island: Picnic areas, short walking trails, salt marsh.
 Chittenden Park: Softball and soccer fields, bocce courts, picnicking, unsupervised beach area
 Jacobs Beach: Public swimming (salt water), playground, volleyball courts, picnicking; nonresidents may use the beach, but are charged a daily fee at the gate.
 Lake Quonnipaug: Public swimming, picnic area, small craft launch.
 Long Hill:  park with playing fields for baseball, football, soccer/lacrosse and field hockey
 Mill Pond: Lighted, supervised ice skating in winter; fishing
 Nut Plains: Lacrosse/soccer field
 Town Green: available for special events

Notable locations
Guilford, Connecticut is noted for its rolling farmland, its avoidance of the density and sprawl that has occurred from land use regulations of its neighboring communities, and its numerous historic homes and sites. 
 Bishop's Orchards
 Guilford Green 
 Rothberg Institute For Childhood Diseases
 Westwoods Trails: conservation area managed by the Guilford Land Conservation Trust

National Historic Places and other historic sites

Historic sites in or near Guilford, which may be listed on the National Register of Historic Places, include:

 Acadian House
 Thomas Burgis II House
 Benton-Beecher House, a.k.a. Beecher Stowe House, visited by Harriet Beecher Stowe as a child
 Comfort Starr House
 Dudleytown Historic District
 Jared Eliot House
 Falkner Island Lighthouse
 Thomas Griswold House
 Guilford Historic Town Center
 Hyland-Wildman House
 Medad Stone Tavern
 Pelatiah Leete House
 Meeting House Hill Historic District
 Elisha Pitkin House
 Route 146 Historic District
 Sabbathday House
 Henry Whitfield House

Notable people 

 Jeffrey Ambroziak, cartographer, inventor, and attorney
 Jamie Arentzen (born 1970), American guitarist, musician; member of various rock bands including Sky Heroes, American Hi-Fi, Dream Club
 Humbert Allen Astredo (1929–2016), American stage, film, and television actor best known for the numerous roles he performed on the daytime Gothic horror soap opera Dark Shadows, most notably that of the warlock Nicholas Blair 
 Abraham Baldwin (1754–1807), minister, patriot, politician, and founding father
 Thom Brooks, political and legal philosopher
 Benjamin Chan, American scientist at Yale University
 Mickey Curry, Drummer for Bryan Adams
 Robert Elliott De Forest (1845–1924), Democratic member of the United States House of Representatives, mayor of Bridgeport, Connecticut, member of the Connecticut Senate and Connecticut House of Representatives, born in Guilford
 David DeMille, physicist and Professor of Physics at University of Chicago.
 Ronald Duman (1954–2020), neuroscientist died in Guilford
 Joe Flood, musician and songwriter
 Nick Fradiani (born 1985), American Idol season 14 winner, born in Guilford
 Moses Gunn (1929–1993), American actor, resided in Guilford since the 1970s
 Fitz-Greene Halleck (1790–1867), American poet and author
 Samuel Johnson (1696-1772), American colonial intellectual and educator; first president of King's College (now Columbia University)  
 Samuel Johnson Jun'r (1757–1836), schoolmaster and teacher of Fitz-Greene Halleck; as the compiler of A School Dictionary (1798), the first American lexicographer
 Edward Ruggles Landon, Connecticut politician
 William Leete (–1683), Governor of the Colony of Connecticut, 1676 to 1683
 Leonard C. Lewin (1916–1999), author of The Report from Iron Mountain
 Timothy Mellon, heir
 Frank Modell (1917–2016), cartoonist, died in Guilford
 Becki Newton, actress in Ugly Betty and How I Met Your Mother, grew up in Guilford and is a Guilford High School Alumna
 Aldo Parisot (1918–2018), Brazilian-born American cellist and cello teacher 
 David Allen Sibley, ornithologist, author, and illustrator
 Lavinia Stoddard (1787–1820), poet, school founder
 Jennifer Westfeldt, actress and screenwriter known for Kissing Jessica Stein, born in Guilford
 Carl Zimmer, science writer

See also

References

External links 

 Town of Guilford official website
 Guilford Keeping Society
 Guilford Preservation Alliance
 Guilford Free Library
 Guilford Public Schools 
 Guilford Chamber of Commerce 
 Guilford, Connecticut at City-Data.com

 
1643 establishments in Connecticut
Populated coastal places in Connecticut
Populated places established in 1639
Towns in Connecticut
Towns in New Haven County, Connecticut
Towns in the New York metropolitan area